Bendis was a Thracian goddess associated with hunting and the moon. Worship of the goddess seems to have been introduced into Attica around 430 BC. Some writers identified Bendis in Attica with the goddess Artemis, but the temple of Bendis at Piraeus which was near the temple of Artemis, clearly display that the two goddesses were distinct.
She was a huntress, like Artemis, but was often accompanied by dancing satyrs and maenads, as represented on a fifth-century red-figure stemless cup at Verona.

The Greeks wrote of Bendis as one of the seven daughters of Zeus who were turned into swans who would later reappear in human forms driving a golden carriage and teaching crowds.

Worship
By a decree of the Oracle of Dodona, which required the Athenians to grant land for a shrine or temple, her cult was introduced into Attica by immigrant Thracian residents, and, though Thracian and Athenian processions remained separate, both cult and festival became so popular that in Plato's time its festivities were naturalized as an official ceremonial of the city-state, called the Bendideia (Βενδίδεια). Among the events were night-time torch-races on horseback, mentioned in Plato's Republic, 328:
"You haven't heard that there is to be a torchlight race this evening on horseback in honour of the Goddess?" "On horseback?" said I. "That is a new idea. Will they carry torches and pass them along to one another as they race with the horses, or how do you mean?" "That's the way of it," said Polemarchus, "and, besides, there is to be a night festival which will be worth seeing."
In Piraeus there was a temple of the goddess which was called Bendideion (Βενδίδειον).

A red-figure skyphos, now at Tübingen University, of c. 440–430, seems to commemorate the arrival of the newly authorized cult: it shows Themis (representing traditional Athenian customs) and a booted and cloaked Bendis, who wears a Thracian fox-skin cap. 

A small marble votive stele of Bendis, –375 BC, found at Piraeus, (pictured left) shows the goddess and her worshippers in bas-relief. The image shows that the Thracian goddess has been strongly influenced by Athenian conceptions of Artemis: Bendis wears a short chiton like Artemis, but with an Asiatic snug-sleeved undergarment. She is wrapped in an animal skin like Artemis and has a spear, but has a hooded Thracian mantle, fastened with a brooch. She wears high boots. In the fourth century BC terracotta figurine (pictured right) she is similarly attired and once carried a (wooden?) spear. 
 
Elsewhere in Greece, the cult of Bendis did not catch on.
Just as in all other respects the Athenians continue to be hospitable to things foreign, so also in their worship of the gods; for they welcomed so many of the foreign rites that they were ridiculed for it by comic writers; and among these were the Thracian and Phrygian rites. (Strabo, Geography (1st century AD), 10.3.18)
The "Phrygian rites" Strabo mentioned referred to the cult of Cybele that was also welcomed to Athens in the 5th century.

Related deities
The Athenians may have blended the cult of Bendis with the equally Dionysiac Thracian revels of Kotys, mentioned by Aeschylus and other ancient writers. Archaic female cult figures unearthed in Thrace (modern-day Bulgaria) have also been identified with Bendis.

Bendida Peak on Trinity Peninsula in Antarctica is named after the goddess.

References

Sources 

 "Bendis", William Smith (ed.) Dictionary of Greek and Roman Biography and Mythology. 1. Boston: Little, Brown & Co., 1867.
 "Bendis (Thracian goddess)", The Editors. Encyclopedia Britannica, 20 Jul. 1998. Accessed 24 January 2022.

Further reading

 Auffarth, Christoph (Tübingen). “Bendis”. In: Brill’s New Pauly. Antiquity volumes edited by: Hubert Cancik and Helmuth Schneider, English Edition by: Christine F. Salazar, Classical Tradition volumes edited by: Manfred Landfester, English Edition by: Francis G. Gentry. Consulted online on 02 July 2022 <http://dx.doi.org/10.1163/1574-9347_bnp_e215260>. First published online: 2006; First print edition: 9789004122598, 20110510
 Beschi, Luigi. "Bendis, the Great Goddess of the Thracians, in Athens". In: ORPHEUS - Journal of Indo-European and Thracian Studies.  Институт за балканистика с Център по тракология - Българска академия на науките, 1990. pp. 29-36.
 Cerkezov, Valentin. "Iconography of the Thracian Goddess Bendis in the Tombstones with a "Funeral Feast" from Southern Thrace". In: Eirene: studia graeca et latina Nº 33, 1997, pp. 53-66. . https://www.degruyter.com/database/HBOL/entry/hb.10712435/html
 Janouchová, Petra. "The cult of Bendis in Athens and Thrace". In Graeco-Latina Brunensia. 2013, vol. 18, iss. 1, pp. 95-106. .
 Planeaux, Christopher. “The Date of Bendis’ Entry into Attica”. In: The Classical Journal 96, no. 2 (2000): 165–92. http://www.jstor.org/stable/3298122.

External links
 "BENDIS - Thracian Goddess of the Moon & Hunting", Theoi Project, 2017. Accessed 24 January 2022.

Culture in Classical Athens
Lunar goddesses
Dacian goddesses
Greek goddesses
Hunting goddesses
Religion in ancient Athens
Thracian goddesses
Paleo-Balkan mythology